Ponte d'Arbia is a village in Tuscany, central Italy, administratively a frazione of the comuni of Buonconvento and Monteroni d'Arbia, province of Siena. At the time of the 2001 census its population was 496.

Ponte d'Arbia is about 23 km from Siena, 4 km from Buonconvento and 9 km from Monteroni d'Arbia.

References 

Frazioni of Monteroni d'Arbia
Frazioni of Buonconvento